Test Drive 2001 is a racing video game developed by American studio Xantera and published by Infogrames exclusively for Game Boy Color. The game is more or less a sequel to the Game Boy Color version of Test Drive 6. It is the last game in the series to be available on Game Boy Color, and the last on a Nintendo platform in general until the upcoming release of Test Drive Unlimited Solar Crown.

Test drive has a 6/10 IGN

Reception

References

External links

2000 video games
Game Boy Color games
Game Boy Color-only games
Infogrames games
Multiplayer and single-player video games
North America-exclusive video games
2001
Video game sequels
Video games about police officers
Video games developed in the United States
Xantera games